American singer Lou Reed released 22 studio albums, 17 compilation albums, 15 live albums, five video albums, 46 singles, 16 music videos, and one box-set.

Albums

Studio albums

Live albums

Compilation albums

Singles

Other album appearances

Studio

Live and remix

Guest appearances

Videography

Video albums

Music videos

References

External links
 Lou Reed Complete Discography and Concerts
 
 
 
 Lou Reed at Rateyourmusic

Discographies of American artists
discography
Rock music discographies